Everspace is a 3D space shooter with roguelike elements developed and published by German studio Rockfish Games. It was released in 2017. A sequel, Everspace 2 is set to be released on April 6, 2023.

Gameplay 
Everspace is a space combat game in which the player progresses through a number of sectors with increasing difficulty. In this game, the player is expected to die. With each death, they can spend earned credits toward Perks, which, in turn, facilitate their following run. The player can find weapons and add-ons that can be used during the current run. The player is also given the ability to craft and upgrade various systems of their ship, including weapons, maneuverability and shielding. An overarching storyline is revealed as the player reaches certain points in a run for the first time. The player can also meet NPCs which give different objectives in order to complete current or future runs and will reward the player once they complete their tasks.

Development 
The developer Rockfish was established by Fishlabs founders Michael Schade and partner Christian Lohr. The game had a successful Kickstarter campaign in 2015. It launched in early access via on 14 September 2016 and was fully released on 25 May 2017 for macOS, Microsoft Windows, and Xbox One. A version for Linux was made available via GOG on 9 May 2018. A PlayStation 4 port was released on 22 May 2018. A port for Nintendo Switch, subtitled Stellar Edition, launched on 11 December 2018. Everspace was made available for Amazon Luna on 12 November 2020. A version for cloud-based console Google Stadia was made available on 1 December 2020.

Reception 

The PlayStation 4 version of Everspace has a score of 78/100 on Metacritic. Anthony Marzano of Destructoid awarded the Nintendo Switch version a score of 6.5 out of 10, saying 'it ultimately is enjoyable' but acknowledging that it would not appeal to a wide audience. Nintendo Life awarded the Switch version a score of 8 out of 10, saying "it performs admirably – if not flawlessly – on Nintendo's console."

Sequel 
A sequel, Everspace 2 is set to be released for Microsoft Windows, Linux, macOS, Xbox One and Playstation 4. It was released on Steam's early access on 18 January 2021, with the full game releasing on April 6, 2023.

References

External links 
 

2017 video games
Kickstarter-funded video games
Linux games
MacOS games
Nintendo Switch games
PlayStation 4 games
Roguelike video games
Science fiction video games
Single-player video games
Space combat simulators
Unreal Engine games
Video games developed in Germany
Video games using procedural generation
Windows games
Xbox One games
Xbox Play Anywhere games
Video games set in outer space
Stadia games